is a compilation album by Japanese singer/songwrither Mari Hamada, released on August 7, 2013 by Meldac/Tokuma Japan to commemorate the 30th anniversary of her music career. The album compiles her singles and select tracks from 2002 to 2013, with two new songs and one re-recording. The third release in the Inclination series, the album's discs are labeled "Disc 5" and "Disc 6"; the latter being a DVD containing a compilation of live performances. A limited edition release includes a third disc containing a bonus track.

Inclination III peaked at No. 11 on Oricon's albums chart.

Track listing

Charts

References

External links 
  (Mari Hamada)
 Official website (Tokuma Japan)
 
 

2013 compilation albums
2013 video albums
Japanese-language compilation albums
Mari Hamada compilation albums
Tokuma Shoten albums